The Hong Kong Cycling Association (in Traditional Chinese: 香港單車聯會) or HKCA is the national governing body of cycle racing in Hong Kong.

It is a member of the UCI and the Asian Cycling Confederation.

See also
 Hong Kong Cycling Alliance

External links
 Hong Kong Cycling Association official website

National members of the Asian Cycling Confederation
Cycle racing in Hong Kong
Cycle racing organizations
Cyc